Elsa Elina Rautee (February 7, 1897 Tottijärvi – February 15, 1987 Nokia) was a Finnish poet of the labor movement who wrote the lyrics in the 1930s to the song "Brother Sister (Veli Sisko)". The song is an anti-war song written after the Spanish Civil War.

External links
 Database of The Finnish Institute of Recorded Sound 1901 - 1999
 Kansan sivistyön liitto (Union of education work of the people in Finland)
 Veli Sisko recorded by Mikko Perkoila
 Brother Sister lyrics in Wikisource
 Brother Sister song lyrics
 Hyvinkään kehitysmaayhdistys (Organization of Aiding Developing Nations of Hyvinkää, Finland)

Books
 

1897 births
1987 deaths
20th-century Finnish poets
20th-century women writers
Finnish women poets